Love in the Big City is a novel by Sang Young Park. Its English translation was published in 2021 by Grove Atlantic in the US and Tilted Axis Press in the UK, with Anton Hur as the translator.

This is the first work made by Park that was published in English. It was longlisted for the International Booker Prize 2022.

Development
The book's English translator Anton Hur lives in South Korea. Hur stated that he found out about the author from reading Korean-language literary magazines, and he had little difficulty translating the dialog. He described the writing style as easy to translate, with what he jokingly called "an Anglo-Saxon vibe".

Content
The true name of the narrator, a gay man who is HIV positive, is never revealed. Some individuals call him "Mr. Park" and some call him "Mr. Young". The narrator refers to the HIV virus as "Kylie" as in Kylie Minogue. He majored in the French language in university. His mother is an Evangelical Christian; Kirkus Reviews refers to her as "acidic" and "ailing". At one time his mother sent him to a gay conversion therapy center.

The novel jumps around in time instead of having a progressive linear development. The majority of the book chronicle's the narrator's time with long time partner Gyu-ho. It also includes a female character named Jaehee, a fellow French major, who becomes the narrator's friend while he is in his 20s. The narrator and Jaehee live in an apartment for a time and discuss their love lives. They distance after Jaehee marries and the narrator moves back with his parents.

The novel is divided into four sections, each with one narrative.

Reception
In South Korea it made the best seller list.

Bobby Finger of The New York Times wrote that the English version "reads like an iPhone screen, vibrant and addictive." He concluded the book is "dazzling".

Kirkus concluded it is "addictive, profound novel" that would "sweep readers up in its sheer longing", although it criticized the ending because it "drags just a bit".

Publishers Weekly gave the book a starred review and called it "Brilliant, glowing, and fun" as well as "stunning", stating that the English version "succeeds in bringing Park’s effervescent voice to English-reading audiences."

The Skinny stated that the English version is "gorgeous" and "captures the wit and bite of Park’s voice, which cuts through the novel’s romantic tenor like a blade."

Hur stated that he preferred the writing style of the author to the characters.

References

External links
 Love in the Big City - Grove Atlantic

South Korean novels
Novels about HIV/AIDS
2020s LGBT novels